Serge Mombouli has been the Republic of the Congo's ambassador to the United States since 2001. He lives in Washington, D.C. He has two children with his wife Stella Mombouli.

Prior to his diplomatic work, he was a businessman in Houston, Texas. He worked in the oil and gas business, facilitating contract negotiations for corporations in Japan, South Africa and other countries.

In an interview on NPR's All Things Considered broadcast in June 2007, he stated: "Tangible development means you can see, you can touch. We need both. We cannot be talking just about democracy, transparency, good governance. At the end of the day the population does not have anything to eat, does not have water to drink, no electricity at night, industry to provide work, so we need both. People do not eat democracy." This comment was quoted in Foreign Policy's Passport blog and in the book La Chinafrique by French journalists Serge Michel and Michel Beuret.

On August 31, 2015, Mombouli became Dean of the African Diplomatic Corps to the United States.

References

Living people
1959 births
Ambassadors of the Republic of the Congo to the United States